Choi Chung-min (30 August 1930 – 8 August 1983) was a former South Korean football player and manager. Nicknamed the "Golden Legs", Choi was one of Asia's greatest strikers in the 1950s.

Playing career
Choi was born in Taedong and grew up in Pyongyang, currently the capacity of North Korea, but he moved south during the Korean War. Afterwards, he enlisted in the Korea Army Counter Intelligence Corps. (CIC) He played for CIC's football club and the South Korea national football team since 1952.

South Korea went to Japan to play qualifiers for the 1954 FIFA World Cup against Japanese national team. South Korean team felt a heavy burden of the two matches against Japan due to pressure from the South Korean public caused by the Japanese occupation until 1945. He scored three goals during two matches, and South Korea advanced to the World Cup by defeating Japan 7–3 on aggregate. In the 1954 FIFA World Cup, however, he failed to prevent South Korea's defeats against Hungary and Turkey.

Honours
ROK Army CIC
Korean National Championship: 1957, 1959
Korean President's Cup: 1952, 1953, 1956, 1957, 1959, 1961

South Korea
AFC Asian Cup: 1956, 1960
Asian Games silver medal: 1954, 1958

References

External links
Choi Jeong-min at KFA

1930 births
1983 deaths
South Korean footballers
South Korea international footballers
South Korean football managers
1954 FIFA World Cup players
1956 AFC Asian Cup players
1960 AFC Asian Cup players
AFC Asian Cup-winning players
Asian Games medalists in football
Footballers at the 1954 Asian Games
Footballers at the 1958 Asian Games
Asian Games silver medalists for South Korea
Medalists at the 1954 Asian Games
Medalists at the 1958 Asian Games
Association football forwards